Ioseb Grishashvili was a pen name of Ioseb Mamulishvili (born 12 April/24 April 1889 – died 3 August 1965) was a noted poet and historian from Georgia. A history museum in Tbilisi, his birth- and death place is named for him. Composer Tamara Antonovna Shaverzashvili used his text for her song “Regret.”

Grishashvili became a member of the Georgian National Academy of Sciences in 1946.

References

1889 births
1965 deaths
20th-century historians from Georgia (country)
20th-century male writers
20th-century poets from Georgia (country)
Male poets from Georgia (country)
Members of the Georgian National Academy of Sciences
Stalin Prize winners
Recipients of the Order of the Red Banner of Labour
Writers from Tbilisi
People from Tiflis Governorate
Soviet literary historians
Soviet male writers
Burials at Mtatsminda Pantheon
Soviet poets